Volcà del Montsacopa is an extinct volcano in the Zona Volcànica de la Garrotxa Natural Park, situated in Olot, Catalunya, Spain.

The volcano has been extinct for about 100,000 years.

On top of the crater is the hermitage of Sant Francesc, built in the 17th century.

External links 

Volcanoes of Catalonia
Garrotxa
Holocene volcanoes
Inactive volcanoes
Emblematic summits of Catalonia
Olot